"Resurrection" is the eighth episode of the sixth season of the science-fiction television series Star Trek: Deep Space Nine, the 132nd episode overall. Major Kira must come to terms with her feelings when a man arrives on the Station that bears an uncanny resemblance to someone from her past.

This episode was directed by Levar Burton and written by Michael Taylor.

The episode premiered to Nielsen ratings of 5.1 points.

Plot

The Mirror Universe version of Vedek Bareil arrives on DS9 in the Operations transporter, taking Major Kira Nerys hostage. He promises not to hurt her as long as he can have a ship to flee the station, because he is trying to get away from the Alliance in the Mirror Universe. Sisko allows them to leave, signalling Odo with an authorisation code. When Bareil and Kira arrive at landing Pad A, Kira points out that the disrupter Bareil is holding has a cracked powercell and cannot hurt anyone. When he attempts to overpower the Major, she knocks him unconscious, and he is arrested by Odo, who appears from the airlock with security officers.

While in the holding cell, Bareil convinces Kira that he never intended to hurt anyone and that merely wants to escape the Alliance in his own universe, and begs her to destroy the device he used to transport to the Prime Universe so that he can never be taken back. Convinced, Kira tells Captain Sisko that she does not want to press charges and that she feels he should be released. Concerned, Sisko warns Kira that while Bareil may look like his Prime Universe counterpart, not to be fooled.

Mirror Universe Bareil attends a Bajoran religious ceremony with Kira and tells her that he will need all the help he can get in adjusting to his new life in the Prime Universe. Kira invites Bareil to dinner with Commanders Worf and Jadzia Dax, and afterward they go to Kira's quarters, where he tells her about his partner who died in the Mirror Universe, and Kira starts to fall for him. They spend the evening together and make love. The following day, Kira takes Bareil to the Bajoran temple to have an experience with the Orb of Prophecy at his request.

When Bareil returns to his quarters, the Intendant, Kira's Mirror Universe counterpart, comes out of the back room. She asks how their plan to steal the Orb of Prophecy is coming along. The real reason for being in the Prime Universe is to steal the Orb and return to the Mirror Universe, where the Intendant plans to use it to unite her Bajor against the Alliance. Bareil visits Quarks bar under the guise of having a drink and then scouts out the Bajoran Temple. Quark warns Major Kira that he has seen the look before and suspects that Bareil will attempt to rob the Temple of something.

Kira surprises Bareil in the temple as he is unlocking the safe where the Orb is housed. In turn Kira is surprised by the Intendent, who holds her at gunpoint. The intendent mocks the Prime Kira, saying that the last two days have all been an elaborate hoax and that the Mirror Bareil never cared for Kira and was merely using her. However, Bareil has a change of conscience and stuns the Intendant with a phaser in the middle of her taunts. Bareil explains to Kira that when he looked into the Orb, he saw Kira and himself together on Bajor with a family, building a life together. Despite what could be, he knows that he would soon find a way to ruin it, as he will always be a thief, and he belongs with someone like the Intendent. Kira says if that's the case, then he should go. Bareil transports himself and the unconscious Intendent back to the Mirror Universe, leaving the Orb behind.

Reception
The episode premiered to Nielsen ratings of 5.1 points.

In 2018, CBR included this episode in a list of Star Trek episodes that are "so bad they must be seen". They note this as one of Star Trek'''s mirror universe themed episodes.

In 2017, SyFy ranked this as the worst mirror universe episode of Star Trek, but did praise  some of the character interactions.

In 2019, ScreenRant ranked this episode one of the ten worst episodes of Star Trek: Deep Space Nine. They note that at that time it had a rating of 5.9/10 based on user rankings on the site IMDB.

See also
	 
 Mirror, Mirror (Star Trek: The Original Series) (Star Trek, October 6, 1967); this is the first Star Trek'' mirror universe episode

References

External links
 

Star Trek: Deep Space Nine (season 6) episodes
1997 American television episodes
Mirror Universe (Star Trek) episodes
Television episodes directed by LeVar Burton